John Wesley Chatham (born October 11, 1978) is an American actor. He has appeared in films such as In the Valley of Elah, W., The Help, and The Philly Kid, and played Castor in The Hunger Games: Mockingjay – Part 1 and Part 2. Between 2015 and 2022, he starred as Amos Burton in The Expanse.

Early life
Chatham was born on October 11, 1978.

After graduating from high school, Chatham joined the U.S. Navy in the rating of Aviation Boatswain's Mate.

Acting career
Chatham's break into acting came just three months before his tour was finished when Denzel Washington chose his ship to shoot the movie Antwone Fisher. Chatham was amongst those selected by casting director Robi Reed while Reed was searching for authentic-looking military personnel for the movie. This was Chatham's first movie-making experience, which led to further pursuit of his lifelong dream of acting. Following Antwone Fisher, Reed convinced Chatham to move to Hollywood and shortly thereafter cast him in his first series regular role on Showtime's Barbershop.

Chatham gained further attention when Paul Haggis cast him alongside Tommy Lee Jones as Corporal Steve Penning in In the Valley of Elah. In 2009, Chatham went on to work with Oliver Stone in W. as Frank Benedict, George W's fraternity brother. The following year, Chatham landed another series regular role on the hit CBS TV show The Unit. Chatham was cast as new unit team member Sergeant Sam McBride (aka Whiplash), working with David Mamet and Shawn Ryan. Chatham also starred as Brian Danielson in Brett Simmons’ Husk (2011).

Chatham portrayed Carlton Phelan, Emma Stone's character's brother, in the 2011 film The Help. The cast won a 2012 Screen Actors Guild Award for Outstanding Performance by a Cast in a Motion Picture. In 2012, Chatham landed his first title role in Joel Silver's The Philly Kid. A fan of mixed martial arts, Chatham dove into the character of Dillion McGwire, performing all of his own stunts. The film debuted in theaters May 2012. Following The Philly Kid, Chatham starred in This Thing With Sarah, which was accepted to the San Diego Film Festival in October 2013. In 2013 Chatham wrapped two studio films, Broken Horses (2013) and The Town That Dreaded Sundown (2014).

Between 2015 and 2022, Chatham starred as Amos Burton in the Amazon Prime Video TV series The Expanse.

Personal life
Chatham is married to TV personality Jenn Brown. Together they have two sons, John Nash, born in 2014, and Rhett Jameson, born in 2016. Chatham missed the birth of Nash, as he was filming episode 2 of The Expanse and his son was born while Chatham was in the air, flying back from Toronto, where they film.

Filmography

References

External links
 
 

1978 births
Living people
American male film actors
American male television actors
21st-century American male actors
Male actors from Georgia (U.S. state)
United States Navy sailors